A national third tier of English league football was established in 1958–59, as the Third Division. This followed on from the regional third tier that had been established in the south in 1920 and the north in 1921. In 1992, with the departure of the First Division clubs to become the Premier League, the third tier became known as the Second Division. Since 2004 it has been known as Football League One.

Football League Third Division (1920–1921)

Football League Third Division North/South (1921–1958)

Football League Third Division (1958–1992)

Football League Second Division (1992–2004)

Football League One/EFL League One (2004 onwards)

Number of titles overall
Clubs in bold are competing in the 2022–23 EFL League One.

References

Playfair Football Annual, various editions

EFL League One
Football League Second Division
Football League Third Division
Football League Third Division North
Football League Third Division South
EFL winners League One